Abassia Rahmani (born 2 July 1992) is a Swiss Paralympic athlete of Algerian descent who competes in international sprinting events. 

She was a very keen and active person who had a huge interest in snowboarding, gymnastics, horse riding and track and field. When Rahmani was sixteen, she had both of her legs amputated due to bacterial meningitis but continued her passion in athletics and tried out Paralympic athletics.

References

1992 births
Living people
Sportspeople from Zürich
People from Winterthur
Swiss people of Algerian descent
Swiss sportspeople of African descent
Paralympic athletes of Switzerland
Swiss female sprinters
Athletes (track and field) at the 2016 Summer Paralympics